Bang Rak may refer to:

Bang Rak District, a district (khet) of Bangkok, Thailand
Bang Rak Subdistrict, a subdistrict (khwaeng) and historic neighbourhood in Bang Rak District
Bang Rak, Trang, a subdistrict (tambon) in Mueang Trang District, Trang Province
Bang Rak Beach on the island of Ko Samui, Surat Thani